Mortimer "Bud" Sprague (September 8, 1904 – April 25, 1973) was an American football player.  He was elected to the College Football Hall of Fame in 1970.

He was one of the eight children born to Minna and George Sprague, of the Oak Cliff neighborhood in Dallas, Texas. Bud's father George served on the Dallas City Council and as the Mayor of Dallas from 1937 to 1939. Bud originally played on University of Texas' varsity football team, and later transferred to the United States Military Academy to play out his eligibility for the Army Black Knights. Eventually Bud settled in the Greenwich Village neighborhood of Manhattan and made his fortune in maritime insurance. He named his son, Kurth Sprague, after his mentor.

References

1904 births
1973 deaths
All-American college football players
American football tackles
Army Black Knights football players
College Football Hall of Fame inductees
Players of American football from Dallas
Texas Longhorns football players
People from Oak Cliff, Texas
Military personnel from Texas